Paul Harvey Robinson (born December 19, 1944) is a former professional American football running back for two seasons in the American Football League (AFL) and five seasons in the National Football League (NFL).

Early life
Robinson was one of 12 children of Leslie Robinson Sr. (1907–1987) and Levada Mallard Robinson (1909–1956), both of Crockett, Texas, who were married in 1926. In 1951, the family moved to Marana, Arizona where Leslie worked as a farm contractor. Paul attended Marana High School, where he played basketball and football, but he especially excelled at track.

He graduated from high school in 1963 and attended Eastern Arizona College, a community college in Thatcher, Arizona. He then received a track scholarship to the University of Arizona and ran track for two years for the Wildcats. But when his track scholarship ended, Robinson turned to football out of necessity for one season, becoming the team's #2 running back his senior year.

Professional football career
Robinson was chosen in the third round (82nd overall) of the 1968 NFL/AFL Draft by the Cincinnati Bengals.

In his first year as a professional, he gained 1,023 yards rushing to lead the league and scored eight touchdowns. He also caught 24 passes for 128 yards and one touchdown. He was the second man to gain over 1,000 yards in his first year in professional football in the U.S., the first being Cookie Gilchrist.  Robinson is the only running back in professional football history to gain over 1,000 yards in a season for a first-year expansion team.

He was the 1968 United Press International and Sporting News AFL Rookie of the Year and finished second in the MVP voting to Joe Namath. He was named to the 1968 and 1969 AFL All-Star Team and led the 1968 Western AFL All-Star team to victory over the Eastern All-Stars.

He also scored the first-ever Bengals regular-season touchdown on September 6, 1968. His two-yard run gave the Bengals a 7–0 lead over the San Diego Chargers at San Diego, although the Bengals lost 29–13.

In his second season, 1969, he gained 489 yards in 160 attempts for a 3.1 yards-per-carry average and four touchdowns. He rebounded his third season, 1970, for 622 yards in 149 attempts for a 4.2 average and six touchdowns.

In 1971, he gained 213 yards on 49 carries for a 4.3 average with one touchdown.

In 1972, in four games with the Bengals, he gained 94 yards in 21 attempts, a 4.5 average. On October 24, 1972, he was  traded along with running back Fred Willis to the Houston Oilers for wide receiver Charlie Joiner and linebacker Ron Pritchard. For the Oilers, he played in eight games, gaining 355 yards on 86 attempts for a 4.1 average and three touchdowns.

His final year in the NFL was 1973 for the Oilers, when he gained 151 yards on 34 attempts for a 4.4 average and two touchdowns.

For his career, he gained 2,947 yards on 737 carries for a 4.0 average with 24 touchdowns. He caught 90 passes for 612 yards (a 6.8 average) for two touchdowns. He returned 40 kicks for 924 yards, a 23.1 average, and he returned two punts for one yard.

In 1974, he played for the Birmingham Americans of the World Football League, where he helped the Americans win the WFL’s only championship game before the team folded during the offseason.

Personal life
Paul Robinson was married to the late Arlene (Hines) Robinson. They had three daughters and also a son, Paul Harvey "PJ" Robinson Jr., who died in 2009. Paul is also the granduncle of University of Texas running back Bijan Robinson. He currently resides in Safford, Arizona.

See also
 Other American Football League players

References

External links
 NFL.com player page

1944 births
Living people
People from Crockett, Texas
People from Marana, Arizona
Sportspeople from the Phoenix metropolitan area
Players of American football from Tucson, Arizona
American football running backs
Arizona Wildcats football players
Birmingham Americans players
Cincinnati Bengals players
Houston Oilers players
American Football League players
American Football League All-Star players
American Football League Rookies of the Year
American Football League rushing leaders